This is a list of all museums, galleries, and museum collections in Slovenia that are open to the public, and in which professional care is taken of the material. They are recognized by "Slovenian Museums Association" and published in their Guide to Slovenian Museums and Galleries. The most recent version of this guide was published in 2008. All changes made afterward are noted in the table below.

Museums and galleries recognized by "Slovenian Museums Association"

Other museums and galleries

Sources

External links

 Museums in Slovenia
Slovenia
Museums
Museums
Museums
Slovenia